The 122-mm howitzer D-30 (GRAU index 2A18) is a Soviet howitzer that first entered service in  1960. It is a robust piece that focuses on the essential features of a towed field gun suitable for all conditions. The D-30 has a maximum range of 15.4 kilometers, or over 21 km using rocket-assisted projectile ammunition.

With its striking three-leg mounting, the D-30 can be rapidly traversed through 360 degrees. Although no longer manufactured in the nations of the former Soviet Union, the D-30 is still manufactured internationally and is in service in more than 60 countries' armed forces.

The barrel assembly of the 2A18 gun is used by the 2S1 self-propelled howitzer. There are also Egyptian, Chinese, Serbian and Syrian self-propelled variants and conversions. The Syrian conversion utilizes the hull of a T-34 tank.

History
The 122 mm (originally 48 lines) calibre was adopted by Russia in the early 20th century, becoming very important to Soviet artillery during the Second World War. Development of the D-30 began in the 1950s, as a replacement for the M-30 howitzer, widely used in divisional and regimental artilleries. The D-30 also replaced the remaining 76 mm M1942 guns in motor rifle regiments.

Military requirements that led to the D-30 can only be deduced. Its role supporting tank and motor rifle regiments, and Soviet doctrine from the Great Patriotic War, suggest that while indirect fire was the primary role, direct fire anti-tank was very important. The latter is evidenced by the very effective HEAT shell, the low silhouette of the piece, its wide and rapid top-traverse and its shield.

The D-30 was designed by the well established design bureau at Artillery Plant No 9 in Sverdlovsk (now Ekaterinburg), at the time led by the eminent artillery designer Fëdor Fëdorovich Petrov (1902–1978). This team was responsible for designing the earlier M-30, the post-war 152 mm D-20 gun-howitzer, and other guns.

Soviet divisional artillery was assigned to manoeuvre regiments (in regimental artillery groups – RAGs) and as divisional troops (in divisional artillery groups – DAGs). A RAG was normally three batteries, each of six pieces, to each motor rifle and tank regiment. DAGs were mostly equipped with 152 mm pieces, but the DAG of a motor rifle division included a D-30 battalion. The role of an RAG was a normal field artillery role to support manoeuvre forces with indirect, semi direct and direct fire.

The D-30 entered Soviet service in 1963 and is sometimes referred to as the M1963. In 1967, widespread introduction of self-propelled guns was authorised and the D-30's barrel and ammunition was used for the new 2S1. When the 2S1 entered service, it was usually assigned to tank regiments and motor rifle regiments equipped with BMP infantry fighting vehicles (IFVs). D-30s were retained in motor rifle regiments equipped with BTR APCs.

The D-30 has been widely exported and used in wars around the world, notably in the Middle East, and particularly in the Iran–Iraq War, a long-lasting war of attrition similar to World War I.

The gun remains a mainstay of artillery forces in developing countries and was deployed in the war in Afghanistan. Soldiers from several western armies have been trained on the D-30 by various user nations in order to be able to train Afghan soldiers on it.

In 2017, the Algerian military displayed a locally developed variant mounted on a Mercedes-Benz Zetros truck. It includes four stabilization legs to absorb firing impacts.

Description

Distinctive features of the D-30 include its low mobile mounting and above-barrel recoil system. The three-legged mobile mount is unusual for field artillery, with stabilizers that are clamped together for towing and deployed when in action. A large tow linkage is fixed to the muzzle; in transport the barrel serves as a trail. Similar mounts were a feature of several 76-mm pre-war (1931–1935) universal (both field and anti-aircraft) guns designed by Leningrad's Kirov Plant (L-1, L-2 and L-3). Other examples were the 1939 French 47SA39 APX, and 1943 German 105-mm light field howitzers designs by Skoda and Krupp; neither entered service. The Bofors 105 mm L28 Light Field Howitzer 4140 was similarly arranged with four legs and did enter Swedish service. The 1930s-designed British 2-pdr. anti-tank gun was another piece featuring a three-legged mounting.

Compared to the M-30, the new howitzer had a significantly longer 35 calibre gun barrel, just short of being a gun-howitzer by Soviet definition. Like other guns of the period, it had a high efficiency muzzle brake; this improved muzzle velocity by 175 m/s to a total of 650 m/s for HE, and raised maximum range by 3,500 m beyond the similar M-30. Maximum range was 2 km better than the 76 mm M1942 at 15.3 km. Weight increased by 650 kg over the M-30, to 3,150 kg; the D-30 is over twice the weight of the 76mm M1942. Accuracy improved, with mean error at about 10 km dropping from 35 m with the M-30 to just 21 m.

Effective stabilisation length is a fundamental aspect of a gun mount, and legs 120° apart need to be longer than those with a smaller angle. The D-30's design minimises this problem in several ways. Trunnions are close to the ground, as a result of placing the recoil system and cradle above the barrel. The trunnions are also at the very rear of the breech; this maximises the recoil space when firing at higher elevation angles. Their rearward position also pushes the recoiling element forward on the mount, maximizing relative rearward span of the stabilizers and so stability during recoil. Additionally there is a very efficient muzzle brake, which absorbs about half the recoil. There is no mechanism to reduce recoil length as the angle of elevation increases.

Some of the design decisions have a price. The muzzle brake produces about twice the overpressure in the area around the gun that is acceptable to Western armies, and is the reason it is often seen being fired with a long lanyard, which reduces rate of fire. Furthermore, the maximum elevation angle is restricted to 18° (early versions) or 22° (later versions) when the breech is over a trail leg. This is enforced by a mechanical cam that prevents the piece firing for about 60% of the total top traverse, and limits range to about 12 km, with full maximum range only possible in the central arc of about 48° between each pair of legs. The extreme rearward location of the trunnions means the elevating mass is unbalanced, requiring a strong balancing mechanism to enable manual elevation. To do this, the D-30 uses compression balancing gears.

A central jack is powered by hand-operated hydraulics. This jack is lowered while the wheels are raised to permit two of the stabiliser legs to be swung 120° rearwards. The mounting is then lowered and the ends of the legs spiked to the ground. This mounting provides for quick traversing to fire in any direction.

The pair of large tires are suspended on a single trailing arm; maximum towing speed is 60 km/h on the road. As was normal in Soviet designs, the tyres were filled with foam. Initially, the D-30 had no brakes and no seat for the layer—non-essential luxuries.

A sliding block breech was adopted instead of the M-30's pre-1914 screw pattern, giving a slight increase in the rate of fire. It is a semi-automatic vertical sliding block breech, with a tied jaw; the block moves down to open and opens automatically ejecting the empty cartridge case as the recuperator forces the gun tube back into battery after a round is fired. The design is closely related to those of breeches on other Soviet post–World War II guns and howitzers.

The non-reciprocating sights are standard Soviet pattern, designed for one-man laying. Included are a direct fire anti-tank telescope, a panoramic periscopic indirect-fire sight (dial sight) in a reciprocating mounting, an angle of sight scale, and a range drum for each charge engraved with the range (distance) scale. The elevation leveling bubble is mounted on the dial sight mount. The range drum enables the standard Soviet technique of semi-direct fire when the piece is laid visually on the target and the range set on the range drum.

Soviet 122 mm howitzers used different ammunition to 122 mm guns, although there was some compatibility. In the case of ammunition for the D-30, the standard 122 mm howitzer shell weight of 21.8 kg was retained, with a metal cartridge case holding variable propelling charges. Cartridge and shell are loaded separately; this means that the shells have to be hand-rammed by a man to the right of the breech with a ramming rod. The D-30 could fire the older M-30 ammunition; however, new shells were also introduced, eventually including a rocket-assisted projectile with a range of 21.9 km. The M-30's range of propelling charges, comprising base and eight increments, was replaced by a new set comprising base and four increments; single base propellant was retained. A more effective High Explosive (HE) shell was developed, as well as smoke, illumination and chemical filled projectiles.

In keeping with Soviet doctrine, the anti-tank role is important; there is a HEAT shell capable of penetrating 460 mm of steel armour plate.

The maximum rate of fire of the D-30 is 6–8 rounds per minute, and about 75 rounds per hour. There is disagreement as to whether this maximum rate of fire is achievable for indirect fire. Based on reloading speeds of similar guns using separate charges, solo re-laying, and given a stable emplacement, semi-automatic breech and no long lanyard, (examples are the 25-pdr. and 105mm L118), and assuming concurrent lay adjustment during reloads, then it probably is when in the hands of a competent detachment. However, 5-6 rounds per minute may be more realistic with a poorly trained gun crew.

The D-30 is noted for simplicity of maintenance by its users; reputedly there are no special tools, all jobs can be done with a wrench and large hammer. However, like any other gun, routine maintenance is essential, and western troops in Afghanistan have reported Afghan operated D-30s having problems with shells sticking in the barrel due to lack of cleaning.

Self-propelled versions
 2S1 Gvozdika was developed on basis of MT-LB tracked vehicles that were often employed by Soviet forces for towing instead of trucks. Combining the gun D-30 with the chassis of the MT-LB, the 2S1 Gvozdika was made. This was the first Soviet enclosed turret self-propelled artillery gun, going into service in the early 1970s. The 2S1 is very light and mobile, and amphibious without preparation. Good mobility and the quick reaction abilities of the 2S1 enhance the flexibility of the D-30, reducing its vulnerability in maneuver battles.
 Sora 122mm  Most modern self-propelled version of the D-30J with automatic loader, inertial navigation system (INS) and fire control system, mounted on a modified FAP 2026 chassis designed by Military Technical Institute Belgrade.
 SH-2 Chinese wheeled version developed by Norinco. It has a modern fire control system and howitzer is elevated by electric motors.
 PLZ-07 Chinese version of tracked D-30 122mm. It has NBC protection system, night/day driving vision, firing control system.
 Semser developed by Israel's Soltam under contract to the Kazakhstani Ministry of Defense, manufactured by local Kazakh companies. Has an integrated automated command and control system, provided by Soltam and Elbit. Is based on KamAZ-6350 8x8 chassis.
There is more self-propelled versions developed by other countries by mounting D-30 on some tracked or wheeled vehicles at disposal of their armed forces. Most of them do not have any complex fire control system and are manually loaded and elevated. Cuba, Sudan, Laos, Syria and Egypt have produced such simplified variants.

Post 1973, Syrian and Egyptian armed forces fielded D-30 guns fitted to the hulls of obsolete T-34 tanks, similar to Israeli conversions of Sherman hulls. This rather crude modification improves the speed of divisional artillery, allowing for the ability to match speed with front-line mechanized forces. A major drawback is the lack of protection for the gunners.

Variants
 2A18 or D-30 – basic model, as described.
 2A18M or D-30M – new double baffle muzzle brake, square central base plate, towing lunette assembly.
 2A18M-1 or D-30M-1 – with semi-automatic loader. Prototype.
 D-30A – modified recoil system, new muzzle brake.
 2S1 Gvozdika self-propelled version.
 Type 85 or D-30-2 Chinese self-propelled version of the D-30.
 D-30-3 – Chinese upgrade of the Type 56 85 mm field gun with 122 mm weapon.
 Type 86, variously, Type 83, Type 96 – Chinese licence-production or derivative of the D-30.
 D30 RH M-94 – Croatian built version, new muzzle brake, redesigned trail, improved hydraulic brake.
 D 30-M – Egyptian licence version of the D-30.
 SPH 122 – Self-propelled version, mounted on a modified M-109 chassis.
 T-122 – Self-propelled version, mounted on a modified T-34 chassis.
 HM 40 Iranian version.
 Shafie D-30I or HM-40 – Iranian version.
 D-30J – Yugoslav version of the D-30 - heavily modified version based on license designed by Military Technical Institute Belgrade
 Saddam – Iraqi designation of Yugoslavia D-30J produced on license bought from Yugoslavia.
 D-30JA1 – Improved Serbian version - further development of D-30J.
 Sora 122mm -  Self-propelled version of D-30J
 M-91 "Mona" – Yugoslav variant with the 100 mm ordnance of the MT-12. Prototype only.
 Khalifa-1 – Sudanese licensed version of the D-30.

Emplacement procedure
A location chosen for emplacement of the D-30 should be as level as reasonably possible. Firstly, the carriage is raised via an internal hydraulic jack located under the cradle of the gun. Once the gun is at the required height, the wheels are raised via the wheel lifting lever; this allows the two split stabilizer legs to be separated from the mono stabiliser leg and brought rearward into firing configuration.

The legs are then locked in place with locking pins. The carriage is lowered via the hydraulic jack so that the legs touch the ground; integral stakes are then hammered into the ground. At this point, the gun is ready for direct fire using the OP4 direct fire sight, or can be orientated and have its position fixed via the aiming circles for subsequent indirect fire using the Pantel sight.

Ammunition
The D-30 fires separate loading projectiles, with variable charges.

Operators

Current operators

 : 85, IISS questions their serviceability 
 Taliban
 : 160
 : 500
 : 69
 
 : 129
 :54 of PL-96 variant
 : 48
 : 100
 : 18
 
 : 500 Type 96 variant
 : 10
 
 : 54
 : 100 mounted on T-34, 55 mounted on T-55 chassis and 25 mounted on KrAZ-255 6×6 trucks.
 : 190 D-30M
 : 9
 
 : 42 H63, delivered in 2009.
 : 309 delivered in 1998–2000.
 Tigray Defense Forces
 : 471 H63
 : 6
 : 58
 : 18
 : 520
 : 540
 
 : 52, the mainstay of the Peshmerga Artillery
 : 100
 : 72
 
 : 42
 
 : 12
 : 20
 
 : 12
 : 12
 : 560
 : 12
 
 
 : 30
 : 189
 
 : 4,570
 : 6
 : 12
 : 78
 : still in use but only for parades
 : 5 received from Ukraine in 2013. The Sudan People's Liberation Army captured others from Sudan during the Second Sudanese Civil War
 : 21
 
 : 10
 : 20
 : 350
 : 129
 : 60
 
 : 25
 : 4
 : 31

Former operators
  Boko Haram
 
 
 : 5 
  - 18 from Romania, delivered in 1992
  - Not operational.
 : 12
  – Passed on to successor states.
 : 130 
   – Passed on to successor states.
  - Passed on to reunified Germany.

References

Sources
 Chris Bellamy, Red God of War: Soviet Artillery and Rocket Forces, Brassey's Defence Publishers, 1986,

External links
 FAS.org
 Globalsecurity.org
 

122 mm artillery
Howitzers of the Soviet Union
Field artillery of the Cold War
Military equipment introduced in the 1960s
Cold War artillery of the Soviet Union